The Two-man bobsleigh competition at the 1968 Winter Olympics in Grenoble was held on 4 and 5 February, at L'Alpe d'Huez. There was a tie for first place. Despite initially ruling that both teams would be awarded the gold medals, the judges awarded the sole gold to the Italian team based on their fastest single heat time. Panturu and Neagoe are the only Romanians to medal at the Winter Olympics as of the 2022 Games.

Results

References

Bobsleigh at the 1968 Winter Olympics
1968 Winter Olympics events